Limerick City and County Council is the authority responsible for local government in the City of Limerick and County Limerick in Ireland. It came into operation on 1 June 2014 after the 2014 local elections. It was formed by the merger of Limerick City Council and Limerick County Council under the provisions of the Local Government Reform Act 2014. As a city and county council, it is governed by the Local Government Act 2001. The council is responsible for housing and community, roads and transportation, urban planning and development, amenity and culture, and environment. The council has 40 elected members. Elections are held every five years and are by single transferable vote. The head of the council has the title of Mayor. The city and county administration is headed by a Chief Executive, Pat Daly. The administrative centre is Limerick. Following a plebiscite in 2019, Limerick is due to become the first local authority in Ireland with a directly elected mayor.

Directly elected mayor
At the 2019 local election, a plebiscite was held under Part 6 of the Local Government Act 2019 on the establishment of a directly elected mayor for Limerick City and County. Voters in Limerick approved the proposal by a vote of 52.4%. In January 2021, the government approved the publication of the report on a directly elected mayor for Limerick.

While an election for the post was reportedly planned for 2021, by April 2021, these plans had been deferred. As of early 2022, the legislation required for such a post had not been enacted, and it was reported that a vote on such legislation may occur "in the second half of the year [2022]".

Local Electoral Areas and Municipal Districts
Limerick City and County Council is divided into the following metropolitan and municipal districts and local electoral areas, defined by electoral divisions. The municipal district which contains the administrative area of the former Limerick City Council is referred to as a Metropolitan District.

Councillors
The council has 40 seats.

Seats summary

Councillors by electoral area
This list reflects the order in which councillors were elected on 24 May 2019.

Notes

Co-options

Changes in affiliation

References

External links

Politics of County Limerick
Politics of Limerick (city)
2014 establishments in Ireland
City and County councils in the Republic of Ireland